The Break-Up is a 2006 American romantic comedy-drama film directed by Peyton Reed, starring Vince Vaughn and Jennifer Aniston. It was written by Jay Lavender and Jeremy Garelick from a story by them and Vaughn, and produced by Universal Pictures.

Plot

Gary Grobowski and Brooke Meyers meet at Wrigley Field during a Chicago Cubs game and begin dating, eventually buying a condominium together. Gary works as a tour guide in a family business with his brothers, Lupus and Dennis. Brooke manages an art gallery owned by eccentric artist Marilyn Dean.

Their relationship comes to a head after the latest in an escalating series of arguments. Brooke, feeling unappreciated, criticizes Gary's perceived immaturity and unwillingness to work on improving their relationship. Gary is frustrated by Brooke's perceived controlling, perfectionistic attitude, and expresses his desire to have a little more independence, particularly when arriving home from work, wanting to unwind.

Brooke becomes irate when Gary fails to offer to help her clean up after a big dinner party at their home. Still frustrated from their earlier, unresolved argument, she breaks up with him (despite still being in love with him). Brooke seeks relationship advice from her friend Addie, while Gary goes to tell his side of things to friend Johnny Ostrofski.

Since neither is willing to move out of their condo, they compromise by living as roommates; but each begins acting out to provoke the other in increasingly elaborate ways. Gary buys a pool table, litters the condo with food and trash, and even has a strip poker party with Lupus and a few women. Meanwhile, Brooke has Gary kicked off their "couples-only" bowling team and starts dating other men in an attempt to make Gary jealous.

When their friend and realtor Mark Riggleman sells the condo, Gary and Brooke are given two weeks' notice to move out. Brooke invites Gary to an Old 97's concert, hoping that he will figure out that the gesture is meant to be her last-ditch attempt to salvage their relationship. Gary agrees to meet her there, but misses the hidden agenda, and misses the concert—unwittingly breaking Brooke's heart. When Gary goes out for a drink with Johnny, his friend points out that Gary has always had his guard up, has been guilty of a lot of selfishness, and never gave Brooke a chance, emotional intimacy-wise.

Afterwards, Brooke quits her job in order to spend time traveling Europe. When she brings a customer from the art gallery home one evening, Brooke finds the condo cleaned and Gary preparing a fancy dinner to win her back. He lays his heart on the line and promises to appreciate her more. Brooke becomes devastated and states that she just cannot give anymore, and, therefore, does not feel the same way. Gary seems to understand and kisses her before leaving. It is later revealed that Brooke's "date" (who initially asked her out, but she politely rejected) was actually a client interested in a piece of artwork she kept at the condo.

Both eventually move out of the condo. Gary begins taking a more active role in his tour guide business, while Brooke travels the world, eventually returning to Chicago. Sometime later, they meet again by chance on the street as Gary is bringing home groceries and Brooke is on her way to a meeting. After some awkward but friendly catching up, they part ways but each glances back over their shoulder and they share a smile.

Cast

 Vince Vaughn as Gary Grobowski
 Jennifer Aniston as Brooke Meyers
 Jon Favreau as John "Johnny O" Ostrofski, a bartender and Gary's best friend.
 Cole Hauser as Lupus Grobowski, Gary's brother and co-worker.
 Joey Lauren Adams as Addie Jones, Brooke's best friend.
 Judy Davis as Marilyn Dean, an artist, gallery owner, and Brooke's boss.
 Justin Long as Christopher Hirons, a receptionist at Marilyn Dean's gallery.
 Jason Bateman as Mark Riggleman, a realtor and friend of the couple.
 Ivan Sergei as Carson Wingham, a client of the gallery who shows interest in Brooke.
 Vincent D'Onofrio as Dennis Grobowski, Gary's other brother and boss.
 John Michael Higgins as Richard Meyers, Brooke's brother.
 Vernon Vaughn as Howard Meyers, Brooke's father.
 Ann-Margret as Wendy Meyers, Brooke's mom.
 Peter Billingsley as Andrew Jones, Addie's husband.
 Mary-Pat Green as Mischa, Marilyn Dean's personal waxer.
 Keir O'Donnell as Paul Grant, a friend of Andrew's and Brooke's date.
 Geoff Stults as Mike Lawrence, another of Brooke's dates.
 Linda Cohn as ESPN Sportscaster (voice)
 Zack Shada as Mad Dawg Killa (voice)

Reception

Box office
The film grossed over $205 million worldwide, with a total of $118.7 million at the American box office.

Critical response

On Rotten Tomatoes the film has an approval rating of 34% based on 192 reviews with an average rating of 5/10. The site's critical consensus reads, "This anti-romantic comedy lacks both laughs and insight, resulting in an odd and unsatisfying experience." On Metacritic, the film has a score of 45 out of 100 based on 37 critics, indicating "mixed or average reviews". Audiences polled by CinemaScore gave the film an average grade of "C+" on an A+ to F scale.

Film critic Rick Groen of The Globe and Mail wrote, "Although possessed of a laudable desire not to be yet another run-of-the-mill, wacky-impediment—damned if the picture can figure out how to be an anti-romance comedy."

Awards & Nominations

Soundtrack

Home media
The film was released on DVD on October 17, 2006. It has grossed $51 million in the US from DVD/home video rentals. It was later released on Blu-ray on June 3, 2014 and again on October 16, 2018.

A double feature Blu-ray was released by Mill Creek Entertainment on October 5, 2021. The release contains the film and The Dilemma, which Vince Vaughn also starred in.

References

External links
 
 
 

2006 comedy films
2006 drama films
2000s English-language films
2006 films
2006 romantic comedy-drama films
American romantic comedy-drama films
Films directed by Peyton Reed
Films produced by Scott Stuber
Films scored by Jon Brion
Films set in Chicago
Films shot in Chicago
Films with screenplays by Jeremy Garelick
Universal Pictures films
2000s American films